The Pigman's Legacy is a young adult novel written by Paul Zindel, first published in 1980. The book is a sequel to The Pigman following the lives of John and Lorraine shortly after The Pigman's death at the end of the first story and how they quickly make up for it.

Plot summary
Just like the first book, the story is divided into chapters narrated by either John or Lorraine.

Taking place four months after The Pigman, this book involves the main characters, John and Lorraine once again. The beginning deals with the lives of the two after the Pigman's death and how it has affected them.

John and Lorraine are walking by the former residence of Mr. Pignati and discover an elderly gentleman apparently on the run from the IRS. He rejects their advances and chases them away. Feeling that the Pigman has given them a chance to make things right once and for all, they befriend the senior, named Gus.

Gus tells the pair that he was a good friend of Colonel Parker Glenville, who was knighted by the King of Sweden for the subway system he designed for Stockholm. They lived in a townhouse in Stuyvesant. The Colonel was later run over by the train, according to Gus, and was apparently evicted. Gus asks the duo to help him retrieve a vital trunk he has left at the town-house. John and Lorraine later find a photo of Gus, who is revealed to be the bankrupt Colonel, Gus being the name of his German Shepherd who finds them at the townhouse and joins the trio. The Colonel later gets abdominal pains on the way back home and is rushed to the hospital. There, the duo learn that the Colonel has diverticulosis, which was aggravated by the fudge John and Lorraine gave him.

John and Lorraine try to help him again and introduce him to Dolly Racinski, the school cafeteria cleaning lady. Soon, the two senior citizens fall in love. One day, the teens and the seniors take a trip to Atlantic City, where John gambles away all of the Colonel's money. On the way back, the Colonel suffers another diverticulosis attack. He asks for Dolly's hand in marriage on his deathbed, and John and Lorraine travel to the convent across the street from the Pigman's house and get a priest to come to the hospital quickly and marry the senior sweethearts, which he does. After the wedding, the teens get Gus from the car, and run back up to the Colonel's room, only to find that he has died, leaving Dolly a bride and a widow all in the same day. It is revealed that the Colonel has undergone surgery a few times to correct his diverticulosis, but in vain. He ran away because he did not wish to die in a poorhouse.

After his death, John and Lorraine reflect on the Pigman's legacy: love.

Characters

Main characters
 John Conlan
 Lorraine Jensen
 Colonel Parker Glenville ("reincarnated" pigman)
 Dolly Racinski
 Gus (the dog)

Other characters
 'Bore' Conlan, John's father
 'Old Lady Hyper' Conlan - John's mother
 Gus - A good friend of Colonel Parker Glenville, who is a German Shepherd

See also

The Pigman
The Pigman & Me

1980 American novels
 American young adult novels
 Novels by Paul Zindel
 Novels set in Staten Island
Sequel novels
Harper & Row books